Cristian Javier Báez (born 9 April 1990) is a Paraguayan professional footballer who plays as a centre-back for Rosario Central.

Titles
 Independiente 2010 (Copa Sudamericana)

References

External links
 

1990 births
Living people
Paraguayan footballers
Paraguayan expatriate footballers
Association football defenders
Club Atlético Independiente footballers
Defensa y Justicia footballers
Instituto footballers
Deportes Iquique footballers
Club Deportivo Universidad de San Martín de Porres players
Dorados de Sinaloa footballers
Godoy Cruz Antonio Tomba footballers
Club Guaraní players
Club Libertad footballers
Rosario Central footballers
Argentine Primera División players
Primera Nacional players
Chilean Primera División players
Peruvian Primera División players
Ascenso MX players
Paraguayan Primera División players
Expatriate footballers in Argentina
Expatriate footballers in Chile
Expatriate footballers in Peru
Expatriate footballers in Mexico
Paraguayan expatriate sportspeople in Argentina
Paraguayan expatriate sportspeople in Chile
Paraguayan expatriate sportspeople in Peru
Paraguayan expatriate sportspeople in Mexico